In thermodynamic equilibrium, a necessary condition for stability is that pressure  does not increase with volume . This basic consistency requirement—and similar ones for other conjugate pairs of variables—are sometimes violated in analytic models for first order phase transitions. The most famous case is the Van der Waals equation for real gases, see Fig. 1 where a typical isotherm is drawn (black curve). The Maxwell construction is a way of correcting this deficiency. The decreasing right hand part of the curve in Fig. 1 describes a diluted gas, while its left part describes a liquid. The intermediate (rising) part of the curve in Fig. 1 would be correct, if these two parts were to be joined smoothly—meaning in particular that the system would remain also in this region spatially uniform with a well defined density.  But this is not what happens. If the volume of a vessel containing a fixed amount of liquid is expanded at constant temperature, there comes a point where some of the liquid boils and the system consists of two well separated phases. While this two-phase coexistence holds as the volume continues to increase, the pressure remains constant. It decreases again, after all liquid is evaporated and the gas expands. Thus the sinusoidal part of the isotherm is replaced by a horizontal line (red line in Fig. 1). According to the Maxwell construction (or "equal area rule"), the height of the horizontal line is such that the two green areas in Fig. 1 are equal.

The direct quote from James Clerk Maxwell which became the Maxwell construction:
“Now let us suppose the medium to pass from B to F along the hypothetical curve BCDEF in a state always homogeneous, and to return along the straight line path FB in the form of a mixture of liquid and vapour. Since the temperature has been constant throughout, no heat can have been transformed into work. Now the heat transformed into  work is represented by the excess of the area FDE over BCD. hence the condition which determine the maximum pressure of the vapour at given temperature is that the line BF cuts off equal areas from the curve above and below.”

Solving the cubic to obtain vapor pressures 
The van der Waals gas equation (using reduced variables) can be expanded  to

which is of the form

To solve this Cubic function one defines several precursor terms :

and 

so that the following become defined

and 

The first root’s precursor form is:

leading to

and

and finally

These last four equations depend on two variables, the temperature which is chosen when one determines which isotherm one is working on, and the pressure.   One starts with an arbitrary (but reasonable) chosen value and adjusts its values as one solves the equation (below)  ultimately obtaining  or   through the Maxwell construction (see below) at that temperature. With these two variables in hand, one can re-substitute the pressure value obtained into the root equations (above) to obtain the three roots.

The Maxwell construction requires solution of the equation (obtained by making the areas under the two loops equal and opposite in value from each other):

with a fixed reduced temperature and the solution depending then on the chosen variable reduced pressure, which becomes the reduced vapor pressure. Unfortunately, this equation can not be solved analytically, and requires numerical evaluation. The subscripts in this equation 

An alternative approach without obtaining roots 

By equating the pressures corresponding to the two volumes where there is a discontinuity in the p-v isotherm, one obtains an expression for the temperature independent of pressure, i.e.,which allows elimination of the temperature from the prior equation.

Its solution is complicated, but finally becomesandwhere

The pseudo-3D   diagram for the van der Waals fluid is shown in the accompanying Figure. For details see lectures from University of Connecticut, articles 88, 93, 95 and especially 96.

The Maxwell construction is rarely derived from the condition that the Gibbs free energies of the gas and the liquid must be equal when they coexist. However, it can be shown that this condition is fulfilled.

Common tangent construction and lever rule 
The Maxwell construction is related to the common tangent construction and the lever rule.

See also 
Van der Waals equation
Phase transition
Conjugate variables (thermodynamics)

References 
 
 

 

Statistical mechanics